Giulio Setti (born Treviglio, October 3, 1869 - died Turin, October 2, 1938) was an Italian choral conductor.

Biography
He served as chorus master of opera houses in Italy, Cairo, Cologne, and Buenos Aires prior to coming to the United States in 1908; there he was engaged as chorus master of the Metropolitan Opera.  He remained in the post twenty-seven years before retiring, after which he returned to Italy.

References
David Ewen, Encyclopedia of the Opera: New Enlarged Edition.  New York; Hill and Wang, 1963.

1869 births
1938 deaths
People from Treviglio
Italian conductors (music)
Italian male conductors (music)
Italian choral conductors
Metropolitan Opera people